Slovak Government Flight Service is the governmental airline of Slovakia headquartered in Bratislava and based at Bratislava Airport.

Fleet
The Slovak Government Flight Service fleet includes the following aircraft in December 2016:
2 Airbus A319 (OM-BYA, in new colors (YOM:2005, with SSG since 2016)), OM-BYK, in new colors (YOM:2002, with SSG since 2017))
2 Fokker 100 (OM-BYC, in new colors (YOM:1991, with SSG since 2016)), OM-BYB, in new colors (YOM:1992, with SSG since 2017))
1 Bell 429 helicopter (OM-BYD, black (YOM: 2014, in SSG fleet since 2015) second OM-BYM, in police colors (YOM: 2015) crashed near Prešov in 2017)
2 Mil Mi 171 helicopters (OM-BYU (YOM: 2002), OM-BYH (YOM: 2003) - both in blue and white livery)

Since July 2016 one Tupolev Tu-154M (OM-BYO) was replaced with Airbus A319-115 ACJ (OM-BYA) and two Yakovlev Yak-40 (OM-BYE, OM-BYL) with two Fokker 100 aircraft, acquired from MJET. Yak-40 OM-BYE and Tupolev 154M, OM-BYO was ferried to Košice where it will be used as an exhibit in the national aviation museum.

References

External links

Slovak Government Flight Service
Slovak Government Flight Service Fleet

Airlines of Slovakia
Slovakian companies established in 1993
Airlines established in 1993